The 1983–84 NBA season was the Hawks' 35th season in the NBA and 16th season in Atlanta.

Draft picks

Roster

Regular season

Season standings

z - clinched division title
y - clinched division title
x - clinched playoff spot

Record vs. opponents

Game log

Regular season

|- align="center" bgcolor="#ffcccc"
| 5
| November 6
| @ Milwaukee
|- align="center" bgcolor="#ffcccc"
| 13
| November 25
| @ Boston

|- align="center" bgcolor="#ccffcc"
| 19
| December 6
| Phoenix
|- align="center" bgcolor="#ffcccc"
| 22
| December 10
| Boston
|- align="center" bgcolor="#ffcccc"
| 27
| December 21
| @ Boston

|- align="center" bgcolor="#ccffcc"
| 34
| January 6
| Milwaukee
|- align="center" bgcolor="#ffcccc"
| 40
| January 18
| @ Milwaukee
|- align="center" bgcolor="#ccffcc"
| 44
| January 25
| Milwaukee

|- align="center" bgcolor="#ffcccc"
| 50
| February 9
| @ Phoenix
|- align="center" bgcolor="#ffcccc"
| 52
| February 12
| @ Los Angeles

|- align="center" bgcolor="#ffcccc"
| 61
| March 2
| Los Angeles
|- align="center" bgcolor="#ffcccc"
| 63
| March 6
| Milwaukee
|- align="center" bgcolor="#ccffcc"
| 66
| March 11
| @ Milwaukee
|- align="center" bgcolor="#ffcccc"
| 70
| March 17
| Boston
|- align="center" bgcolor="#ffcccc"
| 75
| March 30
| @ Boston

Playoffs

|- align="center" bgcolor="#ffcccc"
| 1
| April 17
| @ Milwaukee
| L 89–105
| Dan Roundfield (21)
| Dan Roundfield (10)
| Johnny Davis (7)
| MECCA Arena10,107
| 0–1
|- align="center" bgcolor="#ffcccc"
| 2
| April 19
| @ Milwaukee
| L 87–101
| Dominique Wilkins (22)
| Roundfield, Rollins (7)
| Eddie Johnson (8)
| MECCA Arena11,052
| 0–2
|- align="center" bgcolor="#ccffcc"
| 3
| April 21
| Milwaukee
| W 103–94
| Dan Roundfield (25)
| Roundfield, Brown (7)
| Eddie Johnson (7)
| Omni Coliseum5,395
| 1–2
|- align="center" bgcolor="#ccffcc"
| 4
| April 24
| Milwaukee
| W 100–97
| Wilkins, Rivers (19)
| Dan Roundfield (13)
| Johnny Davis (6)
| Omni Coliseum6,435
| 2–2
|- align="center" bgcolor="#ffcccc"
| 5
| April 26
| @ Milwaukee
| L 89–118
| Doc Rivers (21)
| Dominique Wilkins (13)
| Doc Rivers (6)
| MECCA Arena11,052
| 2–3
|-

Player statistics

Season

Playoffs

Player Statistics Citation:

Awards and records
Wayne Rollins, NBA All-Defensive First Team
Dan Roundfield, NBA All-Defensive Second Team

Transactions

References

See also
1983-84 NBA season

Atlanta Hawks seasons
At
Atlanta Haw
Atlanta Haw